Hyposemansis singha is a species of moth in the family Erebidae first described by Achille Guenée in 1852. It is found in the Himalayas, Taiwan, Myanmar and on Borneo and Sumatra. The habitat consists of forests, ranging from the lowlands to elevations of about 1,760 meters, but is mostly found in lowland dipterocarp forests.

Subspecies
Hyposemansis singha singha
Hyposemansis singha magnipunctata Prout, 1928 (Sumatra)

References

Moths described in 1852
Pangraptinae
Moths of Asia
Moths of Japan